

A

 List of ecoregions in Afghanistan
 List of ecoregions in Albania
 List of ecoregions in Algeria
 List of ecoregions in Andorra
 List of ecoregions in Angola
 List of ecoregions in Argentina
 List of ecoregions in Armenia
 List of ecoregions in Australia
 List of ecoregions in Austria
 List of ecoregions in Azerbaijan

B

 List of ecoregions in the Bahamas
 List of ecoregions in Bangladesh
 List of ecoregions in Belarus
 List of ecoregions in Belgium
 List of ecoregions in Belize
 List of ecoregions in Benin
 List of ecoregions in Bhutan
 List of ecoregions in Bolivia
 List of ecoregions in Bosnia and Herzegovina
 List of ecoregions in Botswana
 List of ecoregions in Brazil
 List of ecoregions in Bulgaria
 List of ecoregions in Burkina Faso
 List of ecoregions in Burundi

C

 List of ecoregions in Cambodia
 List of ecoregions in Cameroon
 List of ecoregions in Canada (WWF)
 Ecozones of Canada
 List of ecoregions in Cabo Verde
 List of ecoregions in the Central African Republic
 List of ecoregions in Chad
 List of ecoregions in Chile
 List of ecoregions in China
 List of ecoregions in Colombia
 List of ecoregions in the Comoros
 List of ecoregions in the Democratic Republic of the Congo
 List of ecoregions in the Republic of the Congo
 List of ecoregions in the Cook Islands
 List of ecoregions in Costa Rica
 List of ecoregions in Croatia
 List of ecoregions in Cuba
 List of ecoregions in Cyprus
 List of ecoregions in Czech Republic

D
 List of ecoregions in Denmark
 List of ecoregions in Djibouti
 List of ecoregions in the Dominican Republic

E

 List of ecoregions in East Timor 
 List of ecoregions in Ecuador
 List of ecoregions in Egypt
 List of ecoregions in El Salvador
 List of ecoregions in Equatorial Guinea
 List of ecoregions in Eritrea
 List of ecoregions in Estonia
 List of ecoregions in Eswatini 
 List of ecoregions in Ethiopia

F

 List of ecoregions in Fiji
 List of ecoregions in Finland
 List of ecoregions in France
 List of ecoregions in French Polynesia

G

 List of ecoregions in Gabon
 List of ecoregions in Gambia
 List of ecoregions in Georgia
 List of ecoregions in Germany
 List of ecoregions in Ghana
 List of ecoregions in Greece
 List of ecoregions in Greenland
 List of ecoregions in Guatemala
 List of ecoregions in Guinea
 List of ecoregions in Guinea-Bissau
 List of ecoregions in Guyana

H

 List of ecoregions in Haiti
 List of ecoregions in Honduras
 List of ecoregions in Hungary

I

 List of ecoregions in Iceland
 List of ecoregions in India
 List of ecoregions in Indonesia
 List of ecoregions in Iran
 List of ecoregions in Iraq
 List of ecoregions in Ireland
 List of ecoregions in Israel
 List of ecoregions in Italy
 List of ecoregions in Ivory Coast

J
 List of ecoregions in Jamaica
 List of ecoregions in Japan
 List of ecoregions in Jordan

K

 List of ecoregions in Kazakhstan
 List of ecoregions in Kenya
 List of ecoregions in Kiribati
 List of ecoregions in North Korea
 List of ecoregions in South Korea
 List of ecoregions in Kuwait
 List of ecoregions in Kyrgyzstan

L
 List of ecoregions in Laos
 List of ecoregions in Latvia
 List of ecoregions in Lebanon
 List of ecoregions in Lesotho
 List of ecoregions in Liberia
 List of ecoregions in Libya
 List of ecoregions in Lithuania
 List of ecoregions in Luxembourg

M

 List of ecoregions in Madagascar
 List of ecoregions in Malawi
 List of ecoregions in Malaysia
 List of ecoregions in Mali
 List of ecoregions in Malta
 List of ecoregions in the Marshall Islands 
 List of ecoregions in Mauritania
 List of ecoregions in Mauritius 
 List of ecoregions in Mexico
 List of ecoregions in the Federated States of Micronesia
 List of ecoregions in Moldova
 List of ecoregions in Mongolia
 List of ecoregions in Montenegro
 List of ecoregions in Morocco
 List of ecoregions in Mozambique
 List of ecoregions in Myanmar

N

 List of ecoregions in Namibia
 List of ecoregions in Nepal
 List of ecoregions in the Netherlands
 List of ecoregions in New Caledonia
 Ecoregions of New Zealand
 List of ecoregions in Nicaragua
 List of ecoregions in Niger
 List of ecoregions in Nigeria
 List of ecoregions in North Macedonia
 List of ecoregions in Norway

O
 List of ecoregions in Oman

P

 List of ecoregions in Pakistan
 List of ecoregions in Palestine
 List of ecoregions in Panama
 List of ecoregions in Papua New Guinea
 List of ecoregions in Paraguay
 List of ecoregions in Peru
 Ecoregions in the Philippines
 Ecoregions in Poland
 List of ecoregions in Portugal

Q
 List of ecoregions in Qatar

R

 List of ecoregions in Romania
 List of ecoregions in Russia
 List of ecoregions in Rwanda

S

 List of ecoregions in Samoa
 List of ecoregions in São Tomé and Principe
 List of ecoregions in Saudi Arabia
 List of ecoregions in Senegal
 List of ecoregions in Serbia
 List of ecoregions in Seychelles
 List of ecoregions in Sierra Leone
 List of ecoregions in Slovakia
 List of ecoregions in Slovenia
 List of ecoregions in the Solomon Islands
 List of ecoregions in Somalia
 List of ecoregions in South Africa
 List of ecoregions in South Korea
 List of ecoregions in South Sudan
 List of ecoregions in Spain
 List of ecoregions in Sri Lanka
 List of ecoregions in Sudan
 List of ecoregions in Suriname
 List of ecoregions in Sweden
 List of ecoregions in Switzerland
 List of ecoregions in Syria

T

 List of ecoregions in Taiwan
 List of ecoregions in Tajikistan
 List of ecoregions in Tanzania
 List of ecoregions in Thailand
 List of ecoregions in Togo
 List of ecoregions in Tonga
 List of ecoregions in Trinidad and Tobago
 List of ecoregions in Tunisia
 List of ecoregions in Turkey
 List of ecoregions in Turkmenistan
 List of ecoregions in Tuvalu

U

 List of ecoregions in Uganda
 List of ecoregions in Ukraine
 List of ecoregions in the United Kingdom
 List of ecoregions in the United States: 
 Environmental Protection Agency version
 World Wildlife Fund version
 List of ecoregions in Uruguay
 List of ecoregions in Uzbekistan

V
 List of ecoregions in Vanuatu
 List of ecoregions in Venezuela
 List of ecoregions in Vietnam

W
 List of ecoregions in Western Sahara

Y
 List of ecoregions in Yemen

Z
 List of ecoregions in Zambia
 List of ecoregions in Zimbabwe